The following article describes the history of Melbourne City FC including the background and formation in 2010 as Melbourne Heart through to its purchase and renaming by City Football Group in 2014 and its season by season performance.

Formation

After the dissolution of the National Soccer League in 2003, brought about by the Crawford Report, plans were drawn up for a new revamped national competition to begin the following season. Two separate plans put forward by the Professional Footballers Australia and Libero Consulting called for the new league to be established under the name "Australian/Australasian Premier League" with two Melbourne clubs to feature as foundation members of the competition. One to be playing in the North West of the city, and another to be playing in the South East of the city representing the two population loads of Melbourne.

Despite the calls for the new soccer competition to feature two clubs from Melbourne, in 2004 Football Federation Australia, opting for a "one city, one team" policy, announced that the Melbourne Victory had won the licence to be the only Melbourne club to compete in the new national competition, known as the A-League. A 5-year moratorium was also established preventing any other expansion sides from the eight original A-league teams' areas entering the competition until the 2010–11 season, allowing Victory five seasons to establish itself in the Melbourne market.

By 2007 the Victorian Major Projects Minister Theo Theophanous put forward the idea of a second Melbourne club being formed to be a founding tenant at the Melbourne Rectangular Stadium, during the protracted negotiations with Melbourne Victory due to the early design of the stadium being smaller than Victory's then season average crowd.

Speculation about a second Melbourne side progressed and on 12 February 2007, South Melbourne FC revealed that they were courting approaches from private investors with the prospect of being the second A-League club based in Melbourne. As part of the South Melbourne bid, the club was to be privatised and the bid name was to be 'Southern Cross FC'.

On 1 March 2008 former Carlton Football Club vice-president and businessman Colin DeLutis expressed his interest in a second Melbourne A-League side, with an approach to the FFA to become sole owner of the second licence with the bid name of 'Melbourne City', not to be confused with the current club Melbourne City. FFA chief executive Ben Buckley raised the possibility of expanding the A-League from eight to 12 teams in May 2008, in readiness for the 2009–10 season. Buckley also revealed the existence of a third Melbourne bid tentatively known as 'Melbourne Heart' backed by Peter Sidwell, to compete with the two other bids of Southern Cross FC and Melbourne City. On 25 July 2008, the Melbourne City bid dropped out of the bidding process leaving the Melbourne Heart and Southern Cross FC bids as the last two bids standing. By September 2008 the Melbourne Heart bid was awarded exclusive negotiating rights for the league's 11th licence, beating out the South Melbourne-backed Southern Cross FC bid. Negotiations continued until Sidwell's group, Melbourne Heart, was awarded the licence to join the A-League's 2010–11 season by the FFA on 12 June 2009.

2010s

2010–11 season

Heart started its inaugural season against Central Coast Mariners on 5 August 2010, at their home ground AAMI Park, losing 1–0. The club's first ever goal was an own goal scored by Ben Kantarovski in the Heart's second league game, a 1–1 draw against Newcastle Jets. Melbourne Heart's first win was a 1–0 victory over North Queensland Fury, which came in the fifth round of their first A-League season on 4 September 2010. They contested the first ever Melbourne Derby against Melbourne Victory on 8 October 2010, and won 2–1. In the middle of their season, they went seven matches without winning (six losses and a draw) and over five hours without scoring a goal. This was turned around when they travelled to play Adelaide United and beat them 2–1 in the final five minutes, despite trailing at 1–0 for all of the second half up to that time. Heart finished their first season on equal points with Newcastle Jets, but behind on goal difference in eighth position. They failed to make it into the top six teams to reach the finals, despite sitting in sixth position for majority of the season.

2011–12 season

On 7 July 2011, the club announced it would take part in the inaugural Hawaiian Islands Invitational from 23–25 February 2012. The squad was set to be made up of emerging youth players as the tournament overlaps with the 2011–12 A-League season. Taking part in the Invitational was Japan's Yokohama, South Korea's Incheon United FC and reigning MLS Cup winners the Colorado Rapids from the United States. Melbourne Heart drew against Busan IPark and lost 0–1 against Colorado Rapids.

Melbourne Heart signed former rival Melbourne Victory player Fred on 20 June 2011, as a marquee player, he replaced Simon Colosimo as captain of the Heart

On 1 September 2011, Heart added the addition of a youth team to the club, which would compete in the A-League's National Youth League. The youth team launched with former Australia international John Aloisi as the inaugural youth team head coach, while highly respected Victorian coach Arthur Papas was brought in as his assistant.

In 2012 the Melbourne Heart Futsal team was founded. They play in the F-League which is top tier of Australian Futsal.

Melbourne Heart's first game for the 2011–12 A-League season was against Newcastle Jets at Ausgrid Stadium. The Heart were defeated 3–2, after a goal by Byun Sung-Hwan in added time. Heart lost their first two matches in a row after being defeated by Perth Glory at home, however they then went on to get 21 points out of thirty, making them 3rd on the ladder.

After their successful start to the first half of the season, Melbourne Heart only won two of their remaining matches, coinciding with the loss of Fred to injury, and Dugandzic, Aziz Behich and Jason Hoffman to international Olyroos duty, They finished 6th on the ladder, enough to make the finals, and had their best season in the club's history.

Heart's first final was against Perth Glory, where they were defeated 3–0 at nib stadium. On 1 February 2012, Melbourne Heart coach John van't Schip announced he was leaving the club at the end of the season due to family reasons.

2012–13 season

Melbourne Heart announced on 8 May 2012 that former Socceroo and Melbourne Heart Youth team coach John Aloisi, had been promoted from his existing position and signed as head coach for 3 years. During the off season Heart were stung by the transfer out of several young key players in Curtis Good, Brendan Hamill and Eli Babalj. However key off season signings included Socceroos Richard Garcia and Vince Grella, and two VISA players in Croatian striker Josip Tadić and Swiss/Liberian defender Patrick Gerhardt.

Heart opened the season with a 2–1 win over rival, Melbourne Victory. The first half of the season was plagued however by inconsistent performances which left the club languishing in last place at the end of 2012, due mainly to second half fade outs.

During the January transfer window, Heart lost a further two key players in Michael Marrone and Aziz Behich on transfers, as well as midfielder Vince Grella to retirement. However they did bolster the squad with returning striker Eli Babalj and Dutch midfielder Marcel Meeuwis.

The new year saw more consistent results at home with 4 wins in a row, resulting in a gradual climb up the table. However, a run of poor results saw Heart finish in 9th place out of 10 teams on the A-League ladder, their worst ever A-League finish. Melbourne Heart veterans Clint Bolton, Simon Colosimo, Matt Thompson and Fred, were released by the Heart at the conclusion of the 2012-13 A-League season.

2013–14 season

Onfield in season 2013–14, Melbourne Heart struggled, failing to win a game until 17 January 2014 (15 matches into the season), recording just six wins across the season. The high point of the season was a 4-0 drubbing of derby rivals Melbourne Victory in March 2014. Striker David Williams managed to score 11 times across the season, while marquee signings Orlando Engelaar and Harry Kewell were restricted to limited game time due to injury. Kewell eventually retired from professional football at the end of the season. Melbourne Heart finished the 2013–14 A-League season in 10th position.

2014–15 season

It was announced on 23 January 2014 that the City Football Group had acquired Melbourne Heart for $12 million. The deal involves CFG acquiring 80% of Heart, the other 20% to be held by a consortium of businessmen allied to Rugby league club Melbourne Storm. On 5 June 2014, the team obtained Spanish World Cup-winning striker David Villa on loan from New York City FC, another team owned by the City Football Group. Villa was expected to play in the A-League until New York City entered Major League Soccer in 2015.

Villa played only 4 of an expected 10 matches, scoring twice, before being recalled by New York. Although none of the matches were won, coach John van 't Schip credited Villa with bringing attention to the new team, and it was estimated that his presence trebled the club's attendance.

Ferran Soriano, City Football Group's chief executive, expressed hope that the partnership between Melbourne City FC, New York City FC and Manchester City FC will create synergies between the clubs. Soriano stated that the access to global scouting networks and operational experience in soccer performance, technical development and sports science would be some of the most important synergies shared between the clubs.

2015–16 season

In August 2015, City Football Group bought out the Holding M.S. Australia consortium to acquire 100% ownership of Melbourne City Football Club.

References

External links
 Official website

Melbourne City FC
Melbourne City